The 1934 California gubernatorial election was held on November 6, 1934. Held in the midst of the Great Depression, the 1934 election was amongst the most controversial in the state's political history, pitting conservative Republican Frank Merriam against former Socialist Party member turned Democrat Upton Sinclair, author of The Jungle. A strong third party challenge came from Progressive Raymond L. Haight, a Los Angeles lawyer campaigning for the political center. Much of the campaign's emphasis was directed at Sinclair's EPIC movement, proposing interventionist reforms to cure the state's ailing economy. Merriam, who had recently assumed the governorship following the death of James Rolph, characterized Sinclair's proposal as a step towards communism.

Negative campaigning funded by the film industry was used against Sinclair to favor the Merriam campaign, as briefly depicted in the 2020 American biographical drama film Mank.

Democratic primary

Republican primary

General election results

Results by county

References

Further reading
 Antognini, Richard. "The Role of A.P. Giannini in the 1934 California Gubernatorial Election." Southern California Quarterly 57.1 (1975): 53–86. online
 Barger, Bob. "Raymond L. Haight and the Commonwealth Progressive Campaign of 1934" California Historical Society Quarterly 43  (September, 1964), pp 219–30. online
 Hill, Patricia Lucy. "Upton Sinclair and the 1934 California gubernatorial election." (MS thesis, Portland State University, 1978) online.
 Larsen, Charles E. "The Epic Campaign of 1934." Pacific Historical Review 27.2 (1958): 127–147. online
 Mitchell, Greg. The campaign of the century: Upton Sinclair's race for governor of California and the birth of media politics (Random House, 1992).
 Rising, George G. "An EPIC Endeavor: Upton Sinclair's 1934 California Gubernatorial Campaign." Southern California Quarterly 79.1 (1997): 101–124. online
 Singer, Donald L. "Upton Sinclair and the California Gubernatorial Campaign of 1934." Southern California Quarterly 56.4 (1974): 375–406. online

California
1934
Gubernatorial
November 1934 events